HVV Hollandia is an association football club from Hoorn, Netherlands.

The club was founded on September 1, 1898 and has played exclusively at amateur level in all its history. Hollandia was part of the Hoofdklasse league since 1991, and completed the 2009–10 season with a sixth place in the Sunday A group, then winning promotion to the newly established Topklasse league for the inaugural 2010–11 season through playoffs.

References

External links 
 Official site

Football clubs in the Netherlands
Football clubs in Hoorn
Association football clubs established in 1898
1898 establishments in the Netherlands